Darra Adam Khel is the main town of Kohat Subdivision (formerly known as "Frontier Region Kohat") in the Kohat District of Khyber Pakhtunkhwa, Pakistan. It has gained fame and notoriety for its bazaars packed with gunsmiths and weapons merchants. The town consists of one main street lined with multiple shops, while side-alleys and streets contain workshops.

Economy
A wide variety of firearms are produced in the town, ranging from anti-aircraft guns to pen guns. Weapons are handmade by individual craftsmen using traditional manufacturing techniques, which are usually handed down from father-to-son. Guns are regularly tested by test-firing into the air. Darra is controlled by the local tribesmen.
The town has certain special laws compared to the rest of Pakistan. Most of the people here make or sell just one thing, i.e., guns, while the second largest business of the inhabitants is transport. Manufacturing of heavy ammunition, however, has been closed down.

Tourism is not advisable because tribal police (Khasadar) visit the market to check for any local rules and law violation. Foreigners without permits are taken to secure places to avoid any mishaps.

The Darra arms trade first fired up in 1897 and became popular with the Adam Khel Afridis.

According to Vice News, the gun trade in the area was affected by Taliban and was forced to go underground.

Tourism
Michael Palin visited the town as part of his Himalaya television series, as did Ethan Casey in his travel book Alive and Well in Pakistan while Australian film director Benjamin Gilmour's feature drama Son of a Lion set in Darra Adam Khel premiered at the Berlin International Film Festival 2008. Suroosh Alvi of Vice Media also entered the market-town in 2006 for a segment of Vice Guide to Travel.

Notable people
 Ajab Khan Afridi
 Maulana Bijligar
 Tahir Afridi

See also
Gun culture in Pakistan
Khyber Pass copy

References

External links
'Tribesmen Rally to the Gun', Observer article  September 23, 2001
Information about Darra Adam Khel, with images 2005
Photo gallery 
Pakistan's flourishing arms bazar BBC News 21 June 2006
Travel account, with images August–September 1992
Like the Wild, Wild West. Plus Al-Qaeda. The Washington Post March 30, 2008
Son of a Lion official website 2008
2007 video of Darra, from VBS.TV
Proliferation of Small Arms and Light Weapons in Pakistan

Populated places in Frontier Region Kohat
Gun politics in Pakistan